Nazımiye District is a district of Tunceli Province in Turkey. The town of Nazımiye is the seat and the district had a population of 3,011 in 2021.

Composition 
Beside the town of Nazımiye, the district encompasses twenty-five villages and 169 hamlets.

Villages 

 Aşağıdoluca
 Ayranlı
 Ballıca
 Beytaşı
 Bostanlı
 Büyükyurt
 Çevrecik
 Dallıbahçe
 Demirce
 Dereova
 Doğantaş
 Geriş
 Güneycik
 Günlüce
 Güzelpınar
 Kapıbaşı
 Kılköy
 Ramazanköy
 Sapköy
 Sarıyayla
 Turnayolu
 Yayıkağıl
 Yazgeldi
 Yiğitler
 Yukarıdoluca

References 

Districts of Tunceli Province
Nazımiye District